The National Union of Food, Beverage and Tobacco Employees (NUFBTE) is a trade union representing workers in food processing and related industries in Nigeria.

History
The union was founded in 1978, when the government of Nigeria merged the country's many unions into industrial unions.  

The unions which merged into the NUFBTE were:

 A. C. Christlieb Associated Companies Workers' Union
 Bacita Allied Sugar Factory Industrial Workers' Union of Nigeria
 Bisco Biscuit Workers' Union
 Cadbury Nigeria Limited African Workers' Union
 Dumex Workers' Union
 Flour Mills of Nigeria Workers' Union 
 Food Specialities (Nigeria) Ltd. Workers' Union
 Golden Guinea and Allied Workers' Union
 Guinness Industries Workers' Union of Nigeria
 Karouni Workers' Union
 Lagos and District Bakery Workers' Union
 Lipton Workers' Union of Nigeria
 Narakat Biscuit African Workers' Union
 Niger Biscuit Company Limited and Associated Workers' Union
 Nigeria Canning Company Ltd. Workers' Union
 Nigeria Cocoa Processing and Allied Workers' Union
 Nigerian Breweries African Workers' Union
 Nigerian Sugar Industry Supervisors', Foremen and Allied Workers' Union
 Nigerian Tobacco General Workers' Union
 North Brewery Workers' Union
 Philip Morris (Nigeria) Ltd. Workers' Union
 Tate and Lyle Nigeria Limited Ilorin Factory Workers' Union
 Trebor (Nigeria) Ltd. Workers' Union
 West African Breweries and Associated Companies Workers' Union of Nigeria
 West African Distillers Ltd. African Workers' Union

It affiliated to the Nigeria Labour Congress.  By 1988, it had 44,405 members, and this grew to 160,000 by 2005.

Leadership

Presidents
1979: K. O. Lawrence
1980: Stephen Olubayo Osidipe
1991: Nansel Haruna Mamdam
1995: John Onyenemere
2008: Lateef Idowu Oyelekan

General Secretaries
1978: Valentine Awah
1979: Solomon Kunle Oyebanjo
1996: Adebayo Kazeem
2006: Isiaka Gbolagade Yussuf
2009: Bamidele Stephen Busari
2012: Lamidi Ayinla Danjuma
2016: Thomas Terhemba Tyoban

External links

References

Food processing trade unions
Trade unions established in 1978
Trade unions in Nigeria